Dominique Valera (born ) is a French kickboxer and karateka, based in Lyon. He has a 9th Dan black belt in karate and is the winner of multiple European Karate Championships. Since retiring from competitive karate Dominique Valera has starred in French movies such as Let Sleeping Cops Lie.

Karate

From a family of Spanish immigrants, Dominique Valera began karate shotokan in 1960, after six years of judo.

He is a team world champion and has never become individual world champion following a disqualification due to a disagreement with a referee1 at the 1975 World Karate Championships in Long Beach, California. The matter then flows far more ink than blood, and the champion suffers immediate consequences. He is excluded from the French federation held by Mr. Delcourt and can not reinstate him until much later when his friend Francis Didier will be the president by integrating karate contact as new section.

Five years earlier, he won one of the first two individual bronze medals in the world karate championships, finishing third with Tonny Tullener of the United States at the end of the men's ippon championship world of karate 1970 in Tokyo, Japan

Full Contact Karate

In 1975 Dominique Valera entered Full Contact Karate and fought the likes of Bill Wallace and Jeff Smith.
 He finished his full contact karate career with 14 victories and 4 defeats.

Achievements
 1966  European Karate Championships Kumite  Gold Medal
 1968  European Karate Championships Kumite  Silver Medal
 1969  European Karate Championships Kumite  Gold Medal
 1971  European Karate Championships Kumite  Gold Medal
 1972  European Karate Championships Kumite  Gold Medal
 1970  World Karate Championships Kumite  Bronze Medal
 1972  World Karate Championships Gold  Silver Medal

Filmography
 1985 : Parole de flic
 1986 : Twist Again in Moscow
 1987 : Terminus
 1988 : Ne réveillez pas un flic qui dort
 2000 : Ainsi soit-il

References

1947 births
Living people
French male karateka
French male actors
French people of Spanish descent
French male kickboxers
Shotokan practitioners
Sportspeople from Lyon
Male actors from Lyon
20th-century French people
21st-century French people